{{Infobox musical artist
| name            = LKT
| image           =
| caption         =
| birth_name      = Olalekan Tunde Olayade
| birth_date      = 5 October 1984
| birth_place     = Lagos, Nigeria
| origin          = Osun state
| genre           = 
| occupation      = 
| years_active    = 1993–present
| label           = Current Punchline Records  
Former           Edlyne Records
| associated_acts = 
}}Olalekan Babatunde Olayade', popularly known by his stage name "LKT" is a Nigerian recording artist, songwriter and performer.

Music biography
LKT began his music career with Fuji music in 1993 but later changed his style of music to hip hop but rose to prominence in 2007 when he featured in the hit song Yahooze, released by Olu Maintain, a Nigerian hip-hop artiste, lkt made the track a hit due to his fuji style which was sensational at that time. He has a unique talent and his very versatile when switching from singing hip-hop, reggae and fuji music. In January 2011, he released a song titled "Follow Follow" featuring P-Square and the song was preceded by  "Alaye Mi''. The remix of the song which featured  Davido was released in March 2012. It was part of his debut album The Journey while the album had guest appearances from Nigerian singers 9ice, Davido, Jaywon, Kayswitch, Olamide, P-Square and Vector. And since then LKT has released numerous songs, his latest "Where you dey" has also been a hit in the Music Industry.

References

Living people
Nigerian male singer-songwriters
Nigerian male pop singers
Nigerian hip hop singers
English-language singers from Nigeria
Yoruba-language singers
Musicians from Lagos
Nigerian music industry executives
1984 births
21st-century Nigerian male singers